Mildred García is the current president of the American Association of State Colleges and Universities (AASCU) in Washington, D.C.

Early life 
García was born and raised in Brooklyn, New York. She is a first-generation college student.

Education 
García earned an A.A.S. from New York City Community College, a B.S. in Business Education from Baruch College, City University of New York, a M.A. in Business Education/Higher Education from New York University; an M.A. in Higher Education Administration from Teachers College, Columbia University; and a Doctor of Education degree, also from Columbia.

Career  
Garcia held academic positions at Arizona State University; Montclair State University; Pennsylvania State University; Teachers College, Columbia University; and at the Hostos, LaGuardia, and City Colleges of City University of New York.

García became the first system-wide president of Berkeley College in 2001 and served until 2007.  From 2007-12, García was president of CSU Dominguez Hills—the 11th female president and first Latina president  in the California State University system.  From 2012-18, she held the post of president of CSU Fullerton.

García is currently the president of AASCU, a Washington, D.C.-based higher education association of 400 public colleges, universities, and systems; she officially began her position on Jan. 22, 2018.

Awards 
 Alfredo G. de los Santos Jr. Distinguished Leadership Award, American Association of Hispanics in Higher Education (AAHHE), 2019

References 

People from Brooklyn
New York University alumni
Baruch College alumni
Teachers College, Columbia University alumni
Arizona State University faculty
Pennsylvania State University faculty
Montclair State University faculty
Teachers College, Columbia University faculty
City University of New York faculty
Presidents of California State University, Dominguez Hills
California State University, Fullerton people
Hostos Community College faculty